Eric Lewis Morris was a Welsh professional footballer who played as a defender.

Career
After being spotted playing local amateur football, Morris was signed by Cardiff City in 1931. He made his debut in a 5–0 victory over Northampton Town in January 1932. In his third appearance, he played in a 9–2 victory over Thames, the club's record victory. He made sixteen league appearances but was released at the end of the season, returning to non-league football.

References

Year of birth missing
Date of death missing
Welsh footballers
Footballers from Cardiff
Cardiff City F.C. players
English Football League players
Association football fullbacks